Thryptomene wittweri is a shrub species in the family Myrtaceae that is endemic to Western Australia.

It blooms between April and August producing white-cream flowers.

It is found on breakaways and creek beds in the Gascoyne and Pilbara regions of Western Australia where it grows in skeletal stony soils.

References

wittweri
Endemic flora of Western Australia
Critically endangered flora of Australia
Rosids of Western Australia
Plants described in 1980